Kenora Catholic District School Board (KCDSB, known as English-language Separate District School Board No. 33B prior to 1999) is a separate school system serving the Kenora District in Ontario. The Kenora Catholic District School Board oversees educational programming for three elementary schools and one secondary school in Kenora and one elementary school in Red Lake. It is the only school board west of Thunder Bay with a dual track French Immersion system from Junior Kindergarten through to grade 12. They also provide Native Language classes at all grade levels.

Schools 
The board administers the following schools:

See also
List of school districts in Ontario
List of high schools in Ontario

References

External links
 Kenora Catholic District School Board

Education in Kenora District
Kenora
Roman Catholic school districts in Ontario